Sorindeia is a genus of some three dozen  plant species that are native to tropical Africa, Madagascar, the Comoro Islands and Mascarene Islands. They are distinguished by their compound leaves, large inflorescences and distinctive fruit. In the case of S. madagascariensis, as many as 200 fruit may be carried on a pendant cluster.

Species
Species include:
 Sorindeia africana (Engl.) Van der Veken
 Sorindeia albiflora Engl. & K. Krause
 Sorindeia calantha Mildbr. 	
 Sorindeia collina Keay
 Sorindeia crassifolia Engl. & K. Krause 	
 Sorindeia gabonensis Bourobou & Breteler 	
 Sorindeia gossweileri Exell
 Sorindeia grandifolia Engl.
 Sorindeia heterophylla (Kunth) Marchand 	
 Sorindeia immersinervia Engl. & Brehmer 	
 Sorindeia juglandifolia (A.Rich.) Planch. ex Oliv. 	
 Sorindeia katangensis Van der Veken 	
 Sorindeia lamprophylla Engl. & K. Krause 	
 Sorindeia ledermannii Engl. & K. Krause 	
 Sorindeia lemairei De Wild. 	
 Sorindeia letestui Pellegr. 	
 Sorindeia longipetiolulata Engl. & Brehmer 	
 Sorindeia lundensis Exell & Mendonça 	 	
 Sorindeia madagascariensis Thouars ex DC. 	
 Sorindeia madagascariensis f. elongata L. Marchand 	
 Sorindeia mayumbensis Van der Veken 	
 Sorindeia mildbraedii Engl. & Brehmer 	
 Sorindeia nitidula Engl. 	 	
 Sorindeia ochracea Engl. 	
 Sorindeia oxyandra Bourobou & Breteler 	
 Sorindeia protioides Engl. & K. Krause 	
 Sorindeia reticulata Engl. & Brehmer 	
 Sorindeia revoluta Engl. & Brehmer 	
 Sorindeia rhodesica R. Fern. & A. Fern. 	
 Sorindeia rubriflora Engl.
 Sorindeia schweinfurthii Engl. 	
 Sorindeia submontana Van der Veken 	
 Sorindeia tchibangensis Pellegr. 	
 Sorindeia tessmannii Engl. 	
 Sorindeia undulata R. Fern. & A. Fern. 
 Sorindeia winkleri Engl.

References

External links

Flora of Africa
 
Anacardiaceae genera
Taxonomy articles created by Polbot